Madina Shoikina (born 31 January 1986) is a Kazakhstani footballer who plays as a goalkeeper. She has been a member of the Kazakhstan women's national team.

References

1986 births
Living people
Women's association football goalkeepers
Kazakhstani women's footballers
Kazakhstan women's international footballers
BIIK Kazygurt players